Russell Cook may refer to:

Russell Cook (musician), hammered dulcimer player and builder from Oklahoma
Russell Cook (footballer), former Australian rules footballer